Walter Page (1875 – 23 September 1958) was a New Zealand cricket umpire. He stood in one Test match, New Zealand vs. South Africa, in 1932.

See also
 List of Test cricket umpires
 South African cricket team in New Zealand in 1931–32

References

1875 births
1958 deaths
Place of birth missing
New Zealand Test cricket umpires